Yanchulova is a surname. Notable people with the surname include:

Petia Yanchulova (born 1978), Bulgarian volleyball player
Tzvetelina Yanchulova (born 1975), Bulgarian volleyball player, sister of Petia